Giuseppe Nardulli (6 July 1948 – 26 June 2008) was an Italian physicist based in Bari.

He was Full Professor of theoretical physics at the University of Bari, and member of the National Institute of Nuclear Physics (INFN). He was very active also in the field of peace, control of weapons and nuclear disarmament. His research fields were elementary particle physics and neural networks.

Biography 
Born in Bari on 6 July 1948, he was awarded the Laurea cum laude in Physics at the University of Bari on 29 March 1972.

Before becoming full professor of Theoretical Physics at the University of Bari from 1994, he served as fellow (1974-77), assistant professor (1977-1983) and associate professor of Statistical Mechanics (1983-1994) at the same university.

He has also been Visiting Scientist at CERN-Geneva (April–July 1983), at JINR-Dubna USSR (May–July 1987), at Centre de Physique Theorique-CNRS, Marseille (July–December 1984) and Paris (July 1994); Professor at the University of Marseille-Aix-en-Provence (September 1990); Scientific Associate at the Theory Division of CERN (Fall-Winter 1999–2000) and at CTP-MIT (Fall 2002).

Author of about 200 scientific papers and proceedings, and of a widely used university textbook on Quantum Mechanics, he was national coordinator of the INFN-funded research project "Phenomenology of Gauge Theories" (BA21); national coordinator of the INFN-funded "Neuronet" research project; coordinator of the Theory Group of INFN-Bari; coordinator of national relevant research projects funded by the Italian Ministry of Education.

Chief organizer of several workshops on High Energy Physics and editor of their proceedings, he served also as Director of the Center TIRES (Center of Innovative Technologies for Signal Detection and Processing) at the University of Bari and Director of the postgraduated course on Technologies for Peace and Disarmament at the University of Bari, Italy.

References

External links
Homepage of the Association of Scientists for Peace
Web page in memory of Beppe Nardulli

20th-century Italian physicists
People from Bari
University of Bari alumni
2008 deaths
Year of birth uncertain
1947 births